Princess Tina (at times known as Princess Tina and Penelope and then simply Tina) was a weekly British girls' comic published from autumn 1967 to summer 1973 by the International Publishing Company, initially under the Fleetway Publications banner. Two comics, Princess and Tina, were merged to form Princess Tina; another title, Penelope, was merged into Princess Tina in 1969; the publication itself came to an end when it was merged into Pink.

The comic was a key link in a long line of British girls' comics titles that stretched from 1950 to 1980, starting with Girl, then Princess, Tina, Penelope, Pink, and ending with Mates.

Notable creators associated with the publication included Betty Roland, Purita Campos, and D. C. Eyles; its last editor was John Wagner.

Publication history 
It was standard practice in the twentieth-century British comics industry to merge a comic into another one when it declined in sales. Typically, three stories or strips from the canceled comic would continue for a while in the surviving comic, and both titles would appear on the cover (one in a smaller font than the other) until the title of the canceled comic was eventually dropped. Princess Tina was a prototypical example of this phenomenon:
 Girl was a weekly comic magazine for girls published from 1951 to 1964. It was launched by Hulton Press on 2 November 1951 as a sister paper to the Eagle, and lasted through Hultons' acquisition by Odhams Press in 1959 and Odhams' merger into IPC in 1963. After Girl''s issue of 3 October 1964 (its 675th overall), it was merged into Princess.
 Princess, published under the Fleetway banner, had debuted with a 30 January 1960 issue, publishing 399 issues before the merger with Tina.
 Tina was launched on 25 February 1967 as "the new schoolgirls paper for 1967." It lasted only 30 issues before the merger with Princess.
 Princess Tina was launched on 23 September 1967 by merging Princess and Tina. The featured comic strips from Princess — Alona: The Wild One and The Happy Days — and from Tina — Jane Bond: Secret Agent — were carried over to the new publication.
 In late December 1969, the City Magazines title Penelope was merged into Princess Tina. This merger appears to have been arranged hastily and left some of Penelope's weekly comic strip serials unfinished, so the endings of these were included in the form of text stories in its final issue, #204 (13 December 1969). The 20 December 1969 issue of the merged title was Princess Tina and Penelope. Despite the combined title, only one comic serial from Penelope survived the merge, albeit with the format and main character's name altered. 
 The title reverted to simply Princess Tina with the 6 June 1970 issue.
 With the 18 March 1972 issue, the title logo began emphasizing Tina with Princess much smaller — from a distance, the title appeared to simply be Tina.
 The magazine went on a publishing hiatus from the 13 January 1973 issue to the 31 March 1973 issue, a gap of about  months. When it returned, the title was now simply Tina.
 In August 1973 the publication was merged into Pink. At first, the merged title remained simply Pink, but by issue #48 (23 February 1974) it was retitled Pink & Tina. By issue #89 (December 1974), the title had reverted to Pink. 
 Pink was merged into its sister IPC title Mates in 1980.

Annuals and specials 
Twelve hardcover Princess Tina annuals were published between 1968 and 1980 (bearing the cover dates 1969–1981). Other hardcover annuals associated with the title were Princess Tina Ballet Book, dated 1969 to 1977, and Princess Tina Pony Book, from 1969 to 1981. Five annual saddle-stapled magazines were published as Princess Tina Summer Extra dated 1969 to 1974.

Content 
Princess Tina continued regular features, text stories and serials, a letters page (Tell Us About It), and comic strips. In an unusual gesture, many text and feature writers were credited, but usually only by their first name.

One of the title's most notable strips was Purita Campos' Patty's World, created with writer Philip Douglas, "about the everyday life of 13-year old Patty Lucas." Launched in 1971, the strip survived the merger with Pink, finally moving on to Mates, and then the 1980s relaunch of Girl, finally ending in 1988. As described in Lambiek's Comiclopedia:

Dutch version 
Launched in 1967, the Dutch comic Tina was initially a translated version of Princess Tina (but unlike the source publication, was from the start executed in color). It became the most notable of the British-inspired girls' magazines which published a lot of comics, predominantly from British origin (albeit mostly drawn by anonymous Spanish Fleetway studios artists), just like Sjors magazine had at first. And like Sjors, Tina would provide a platform for Dutch talents like Jan Kruis, Jan Steeman, and Patty Klein to flourish, unsurprisingly perhaps as both magazines were at the time published by Dutch publishing house .

Features 
 Flower Arranging
 Make This With Jeffy written by Jeffy (real name Jennifer)
 Pop People
 Princess Tina Cook Book
 Stop 'n' Chat with the Tina Gang, written by Linda, Jeffy (Jennifer), and Horace
 Summer Line-up

Serials and text stories 
 Janey by Jemma
 "Fire!" by Horace

Strips 
 Alona: The Wild One by Leslie Otway (from 1967; continued from Princess)
 Barbie the Model Girl, illustrated by E. A. Allen (from 1967; continued from Princess) — about the fashion doll of the same name
 Briony Andrews, drawn by Rodrigo Comos
 Clueless drawn by John Richardson — humour strip about a blundering dog
 Freedom Island, drawn by Juan Solé Puyal
 The Happy Days by Jenny Butterworth and Andrew J. Wilson (from 1967; continued from Princess)
 Jackie & the Wild Boys
 Jane Bond: Secret Agent by Mike Hubbard (continued from Tina)
 Jinny below Stairs, drawn by Julian Vivas
 Lassie Come Home by Andrew J. Wilson (1968–1969)
 No Swimming Allowed!, drawn by Santiago Hernandez
 Patty's World by Philip Douglas and Purita Campos (1971–1973; continued in Pink)
 Problem Pony, drawn by Edmond Ripoll
 Ross – Student Nurse, drawn by Colin Merrett
 Run, Kristina, Run by Terence Magee (continued from Princess)
 Space Girls by Keith Watson (continued from Tina)
 Tina Aims for the Top!, drawn by Candido Ruiz Pueyo
 The Trolls by Hugh McNeill
 Vicky in Australia by Betty Roland and Dudley Pout — reprinted from Girl, where it ran from 1954 to 1958
 Willy the Wily Wolf by Hugh McNeill

References

Citations

Sources 

 
 
 
 
 
 
 

1967 comics debuts
Children's magazines published in the United Kingdom
British comics titles
British girls' comics
Weekly magazines published in the United Kingdom
Comics anthologies
Defunct British comics
Defunct magazines published in the United Kingdom
Fleetway and IPC Comics titles
Magazines established in 1967
Magazines disestablished in 1973